Ichnusomunda sacchii is a species of air-breathing land snails, terrestrial pulmonate gastropod mollusks in the family Hygromiidae, the hairy snails and their allies.

This species is endemic to Italy.  Its natural habitats are temperate grassland and sandy shores. It is threatened by habitat loss.

References

sacchii
Molluscs of Europe
Endemic fauna of Italy
Gastropods described in 1998
Taxonomy articles created by Polbot